Coed Ely railway station served the portion of the Ely Valley around the mining communities of Thomastown and Coed-Ely in South Wales, between 1925 and 1958.

History
A passenger service between Llantrisant, Tonyrefail and Penygraig was introduced on 1 May 1901, operated by the Great Western Railway (GWR). After the EVR had been absorbed by the GWR, an additional halt was opened at Coed Ely on 13 July 1925; it was situated between Llantrisant and Tonyrefail.

The station had two platforms, each 300 feet in length. It had a building on the 'up' platform only. This was constructed from timber and asbestos. It contained waiting rooms and conveniences. The booking office was situated beside the approach footpath from the main road, at the northerly end of the 'up' platform. The 'down' platform was without any form of shelter. The station had no footbridge, passengers having to cross the line by means of a sleeper level crossing.

The station was closed when passenger services were withdrawn from the Ely Valley line from 9 June 1958.

References

External links
Coed Ely Station on navigable 1947 O.S. map

Disused railway stations in Rhondda Cynon Taf
Former Great Western Railway stations
Railway stations in Great Britain opened in 1925
Railway stations in Great Britain closed in 1958